This article lists queens, countesses, and duchesses consort of the Kingdom, County, Duchy of Burgundy.

Queen consort of Burgundy

Queen consort of the Burgundians (till 534)

Frankish Burgundy (534–855)

Merovingian dynasty (534–751)

Carolingian dynasty (751–855)

After Lothar's death in 855, his realm was divided between his sons. The Burgundian territories were divided between:

Lothair II, who received the northern parts (Upper Burgundy).
Charles, who received the southern parts including Provence, Lyon and Vienne. His realm was called the regnum provinciae (kingdom of Provence) or Lower Burgundy.

Lower Burgundy (855–863)

After the division of the Carolingian Empire by the Treaty of Verdun (843), the first of the fraternal rulers of the three kingdoms to die was Lothair I, who divided his middle kingdom in accordance with the custom of the Franks between his three sons. Out of this division came the Kingdom of Provence, given to Lothair's youngest son, Charles. A heritage of royal rule was thus inaugurated in Provence that, though it was often subsumed into one of its larger neighbouring kingdoms, it was just as often proclaiming its own sovereigns.

Carolingian dynasty (855–879)

Bosonid dynasty (879–933)

In 933, Provence ceases to be a separate kingdom as Hugh exchanged it with Rudolph II of Upper Burgundy for the Iron Crown of Lombardy, that is, rule of Italy.

Welf dynasty (888–1032) 

In 1032 the kingdom of Upper and Lower Burgundy was incorporated into the Holy Roman Empire as a third kingdom, the Kingdom of Burgundy (later known as Kingdom of Arles), with the King of Germany or Emperor as King of Burgundy.

Upper Burgundy (855–1032)

Carolingian dynasty (855–888)
Lothair II subsumed his portion of Burgundy into the Kingdom of Lotharingia and at his brother Charles' death, gained some northern districts of the deceased's kingdom. When Lothair II died in 869, his realm was divided between his uncles Charles the Bald and Louis the German in the Treaty of Meerssen.

When Emperor Charles the Fat, who until 884 had reunited all Frankish kingdoms except for kingdom of Provence, died in 888, the nobles and leading clergy of Upper Burgundy assembled at St Maurice and elected Rudolph, count of Auxerre, from the Elder House of Welf, as king. At first, he tried to reunite the realm of Lothair II, but opposition by Arnulf of Carinthia forced him to focus on his Burgundian territory.

Welf dynasty (888–1032) 

In 1032 the kingdom of Upper and Lower Burgundy was incorporated into the Holy Roman Empire as a third kingdom, the Kingdom of Burgundy (later known as the Kingdom of Arles), with the King of Germany or Emperor as King of Burgundy.

Holy Roman Empress, Queen consort of the Kingdom of Burgundy (1032–1378)

Salian dynasty (1032–1125)

Supplinburger dynasty (1125–1137)

Hohenstaufen dynasty (1138–1208)

Welf dynasty (1208–1215)

Hohenstaufen dynasty (1212–1254)
I am not sure if the title King of Arles went to the King of the Romans under a Holy Roman Emperor or not.

House of Habsburg (1273–1291)

House of Nassau (1292–1298)

House of Habsburg (1298–1308)

House of Luxembourg (1308–1313)

House of Habsburg (1314–1322)

House of Wittelsbach (1314–1347)

House of Luxembourg (1346–1378)

Countess consort of Burgundy

House of Ivrea (995–1190)

House of Hohenstaufen (1190–1231)

House of Andechs (1231–1279)

House of Ivrea (1279–1330)

House of Burgundy (1347–1361)

House of Capet (1361–1382) 
None

House of Valois-Burgundy (1405–1482)

House of Habsburg (1482–1678) 

In 1678 the County of Burgundy was annexed by France as part of the Treaty of Nijmegen, and the title fell into abeyance.

Duchess consort of Burgundy

Independent Burgundy (880–1044)

Bosonid dynasty (880–956) 
The first margrave (marchio), later duke (dux), of Burgundy was Richard of the House of Ardennes, whose duchy was created from the merging of several regional counties of the kingdom of Provence which had belonged to his brother Boso.

His descendants and their relatives by marriage ruled the duchy until its annexation over a century later by the French crown, their suzerain.

Robertian dynasty (956–1004)

Burgundy under the French (1044–1477)

House of Capet (1004–1032) 
In 1004, Burgundy was annexed by the king, of the House of Capet. Otto II William continued to rule what would come to be called the Free County of Burgundy.  His descendants formed another House of Ivrea.

House of Burgundy (1032–1361) 
Robert, son of Robert II of France, received the Duchy as a peace settlement, having disputed the succession to the throne of France with his brother Henry.

House of Valois-Burgundy (1361–1477) 
John II of France, the second Valois king, successfully claimed the Duchy after the death of Philip, the last Capet duke. John then passed the duchy to his younger son Philip as an apanage.

Burgundy in pretension (1477–1477)

House of Habsburg (1482–1795) 

In 1477, the territory of the Duchy of Burgundy was annexed by France. In the same year, Mary married Maximilian, Archduke of Austria, giving the Habsburgs control of the remainder of the Burgundian Inheritance.

Although the territory of the Duchy of Burgundy itself remained in the hands of France, the Habsburgs remained in control of the title of Duke of Burgundy and the other parts of the Burgundian inheritance, notably the Low Countries and the Free County of Burgundy in the Holy Roman Empire. They often used the term Burgundy to refer to it (e.g. in the name of the Imperial Circle it was grouped into), until the late 18th century, when the Austrian Netherlands were lost to French Republic. The Habsburgs also continued to claim Burgundy proper until the Treaty of Cambrai in 1529, when they surrendered their claim in exchange for French recognition of Imperial sovereignty over Flanders and Artois.

Notes

Burgundy
Burgundy
Burgundy
 
 
 
Lists of French nobility

Consorts
Burgundy, List of royal consorts of
Lists of French women